The 2015–16 UConn Huskies men's ice hockey team will represent the University of Connecticut in the 2015–16 NCAA Division I men's ice hockey season. The team is coached by Mike Cavanaugh his third season behind the bench at UConn. The Huskies play their home games at the XL Center in downtown Hartford, Connecticut, competing in their second season in Hockey East.

Personnel

Roster

As of September 4, 2015.

Coaching staff

Standings

Schedule

Regular season

|-
!colspan=12 style=""| Exhibition

|-
!colspan=12 style=""| Regular Season

|-
!colspan=12 style=""| Hockey East Tournament

References

UConn Huskies men's ice hockey seasons
Connecticut
Connecticut
Connecticut Huskies men's ice hockey season
Connecticut Huskies men's ice hockey season